Gloria Schiff (31 May 1928 - 2 May 2019) was an American socialite and the editor of Vogue magazine.

Her twin sister was Consuelo Crespi.

References 

1928 births
2019 deaths
American magazine editors
Women magazine editors
People from New York (state)
American women journalists
American socialites
Vogue (magazine) people
21st-century American women